Acacia subcaerulea is a shrub of the genus Acacia and the subgenus Phyllodineae. It is native to coastal areas in the  Goldfields-Esperance, Great Southern and South West regions of Western Australia.

Description
It blooms from March to September and produces yellow flowers.

See also
 List of Acacia species

References

subcaerulea
Acacias of Western Australia
Taxa named by John Lindley